Baranda (Serbian Cyrillic: Баранда) is a village in Serbia. It is situated in the Opovo municipality, South Banat District, Vojvodina province. The village has a Serb ethnic majority (93.56%) and its population numbering 1,550 people.
The village was a center point of the popular television series "Vratiće se rode" (English: The Storks Will Return).

Historical population
Baranda has been experiencing a steady but constant population decline over the decades.

1961: 1,841
1971: 1,671
1981: 1,656
1991: 1,690
2002: 1,688
2011: 1,550

See also
List of places in Serbia
List of cities, towns and villages in Vojvodina

References
Slobodan Ćurčić, Broj stanovnika Vojvodine, Novi Sad, 1996.

External links
Municipalities of Vojvodina
Dobar dan, ja sam iz Barande, Blic, November 23, 2008

Populated places in Serbian Banat
Populated places in South Banat District
Opovo